Will Page is the former Chief Economist at Spotify, a Swedish-based digital music service. To date, Spotify has launched in 57 countries around the world and recently announced that it has reached 40 million active users and over 10 million paying subscribers.

Career
Page graduated with an MSc in Economics at the University of Edinburgh in 2002. His Masters thesis ‘Germany's Mezzogiorno Revisited’ looked at the problems facing East Germany ten years after German Reunification. The paper was published by Deutsche Bank in 2003, and cited in 2005 by Martin Wolf in the Financial Times.

He previously worked for the UK Government Economic Service at the Scottish Executive working for the Office of the Chief Economic Adviser and Department of Finance. He contributed to the Scottish Executive Economic Discussion Paper Series with a publication on ‘Infrastructure Investment & Economic Growth’.

During this period, he established a moonlighting career in music, writing for the award winning publication Straight No Chaser (magazine) and working with the Brazilian composer Eumir Deodato.

Page previously worked at PRS for Music, a non-profit collection society representing writers, composers and music publishers in the UK. In this role he published writing about the economic strength of the UK music industry, Long Tail theory in the music industry, and on the success of Radiohead's In Rainbows album.

Page's publication of 'In Rainbows, On Torrents' with Eric Garland is his most cited collaboration. It discussed whether the Radiohead legal free offering could compete with illegal free downloads. He also challenged the popular Long Tail theory, showing that the demand for digital music instead followed a log-normal distribution.

His most notable contribution to the music industry is an annual report titled ‘Adding up the UK Music Industry’. The report shows how much the UK music industry is worth and how it all hangs together. This publication has received extensive press coverage in The Guardian, The Times and Financial Times.

Page contributed to the campaign to save the new music radio station BBC 6 Music in May 2010. He presented two facts to the debate: (i) 6 Music is playing more unique songs and (ii) paying royalties to more unique songwriters than any other radio station.

Spotify
Page joined Spotify in 2012. In this role, his work has looked at data on 'the anatomy of a hit' for artists like Lorde and Mr Probz, as well as an annual publication on the global value of copyright. He has looked at whether the music industry's definition of a 'catalogue' needs to be reconsidered, and drawn attention to the value of the UK music industry as a national export.

Page was profiled by the Telegraph in 2017 along with other leading strategists at digital companies. His work has also been noted in the Economist, and Financial Times.

In July, 2019 it was reported that Page is leaving the company in the autumn.

References

External links
Will Page offers a Listmania on Amazon titled 'Rockonomics', a frequently updated list of reading material on music industry economics
Music Industry Research Papers by Will Page, published by the PRS for Music
ArtistRack Spotify Playlist Promotion Submission
Spotify Playlist Promotion Service

Living people
Alumni of the University of Edinburgh
Year of birth missing (living people)
Spotify people